Laz-D (born Cameron Lasley in 1982) is an American rapper with Down syndrome. His stage name was given to him by NBA basketball player and former classmate Salim Stoudamire. He was introduced to the rap music scene by rap producers Jonathan Worcester and Jack Gibson, who later produced and mixed most of the songs on his seminal debut, The Man Himself, at the D Compound. He is known for performing at the "Buddy Walk" every year in Lake Oswego.

Discography 
 The Man Himself (2006)
 In My Face (2009)
Against These Walls (2012) (as Cam Lasley)

References

External links 
 
 Lake Oswego Review newspaper feature on Laz D
 
 NME: LAZ D - "The Man Himself" Documentary video
 
 

1982 births
Living people
American people with disabilities
People from Lake Oswego, Oregon
People with Down syndrome
Rappers from Oregon
West Coast hip hop musicians
Lake Oswego High School alumni
21st-century American rappers